Thomas Gipps Ahearn (born 6 August 1929) was a member of the Queensland Legislative Assembly.

Biography
Ahearn was born at Nanango, Queensland, the son of Leslie Norman Ahearn and his wife Hilda Christina (née Hansen). He was educated at the Toowoomba Anglican College and Preparatory School, the Slade School, Warwick, and Toowoomba Grammar School before going on to the University of Queensland. He was the senior chemistry master at The Southport School in 1949-1950 and in 1957 established the company TH Ahearn and Co which he ran until 1997.

On 28 June 1952 he married Sonia Rochelle Davies (died 2016) and together had a son and two daughters.

Public career
Ahearn won the seat of Sandgate for the Liberal Party at the 1957 Queensland state election, defeating Harry Dean of the Labor Party and the sitting member, Herbert Robinson of the Queensland Labor Party. Ahearn held the seat for one term, losing to Harry Dean in 1960.

References

Members of the Queensland Legislative Assembly
1929 births
Liberal Party of Australia members of the Parliament of Queensland
Living people